John Franklin "Jay" Heaps (born August 2, 1976) is an American former soccer player who currently serves as president and general manager of Birmingham Legion FC.  He is a former head coach for the New England Revolution in Major League Soccer.

After a successful college career at Duke University, Heaps spent his entire professional playing career in Major League Soccer, initially with Miami Fusion, and then with New England Revolution, for whom he made over 250 appearances in all competitions. Towards the end of his career Heaps also played with the United States men's national soccer team, earning four caps at the 2009 CONCACAF Gold Cup. He was coach of the New England Revolution from 2011 to 2017. He was also part of the Lamar Hunt U.S. Open Cup winning 2007 roster and was part of the 2008 North American SuperLiga winning roster.  He was on the Miami Fusion team from 1999 to 2001. He then played for the New England Revolution from 2001 to 2009. He won Defender of the Year in 2009 for the New England Revolution.

Career

College
Heaps grew up in Longmeadow, Massachusetts, and graduated from Longmeadow High School. He played college soccer for the Duke University Blue Devils from 1995 to 1998. He was named first team All-ACC all four of his years, was a three-time finalist for the Hermann Award, and as a senior was awarded the Hermann Trophy by the Missouri Athletic Club, marking him as the nation's top college player. During his four years at Duke, he had 45 goals and 37 assists across 83 appearances. Additionally, Heaps played for the Duke Blue Devils men's basketball team under Mike Krzyzewski from 1996 to 1999. He appeared in 27 games and played 68 minutes total.

Professional
After graduating from Duke, Heaps was drafted second overall in the 1999 MLS College Draft by Miami Fusion, and was named MLS Rookie of the Year after playing 2511 minutes for the team in midfield and defense. In his second year, Heaps was named an MLS All-Star, while registering 5 goals and six assists for the Fusion. Before the 2001 season, he was traded to the New England Revolution in exchange for Brian Dunseth. In the 2006 MLS Cup Championship, his penalty kick was saved by Pat Onstad, winning the championship for the opposing Houston Dynamo.

Heaps announced his retirement from soccer on December 3, 2009.

International
As of February 2009, Heaps had played more MLS matches (289) than any other American player who had not received a cap for the United States. On June 25, 2009, Heaps received his first call-up for the United States for the 2009 CONCACAF Gold Cup. On July 11, 2009, Heaps made his debut with the United States against Haiti.

Post-playing career
After announcing his retirement from professional soccer, Heaps joined Morgan Stanley Private Wealth Management, providing customized investment advice and portfolio management for ultra high-net-worth individuals.

In 2010, Heaps became the color commentator for the New England Revolution games on Comcast SportsNet New England, alongside Brad Feldman.

In 2018, Heaps was announced as the first president and general manager of the expansion USL club Birmingham Legion FC in Birmingham, AL.

Coaching career
On November 14, 2011, Heaps was named the head coach for the New England Revolution, replacing former Revolution coach Steve Nicol whose contract was not renewed following the 2011 Major League Soccer season. In the 2012,  2013, and  2014 seasons, the results of this change appeared positive, with each year after the first showing improved results. In 2014, the Revolution made it to the MLS Cup, narrowly losing to the LA Galaxy. However, in 2015, the team was eliminated from playoff contention in the knockout round, and in 2016, they failed to qualify entirely.

In mid 2017, the team sat 10th out of 11 in the Eastern Conference, with SportsClubStats.com offering a 7% chance of the team making the playoffs. This led to speculation that Heaps is or should be facing removal as head coach.
On September 18, it was reported  that Heaps had been fired by the Revolution and that his spot would be filled in by assistant coach Tom Soehn.

Managerial statistics

Honors

New England Revolution
Lamar Hunt U.S. Open Cup: 2007
North American SuperLiga: 2008

Individual
MLS Rookie of the Year: 1999

References

External links
 MLS player profile

1976 births
Living people
American soccer players
American soccer coaches
Association football defenders
Miami Fusion players
New England Revolution players
Duke Blue Devils men's basketball players
Duke Blue Devils men's soccer players
Major League Soccer All-Stars
Major League Soccer players
Miami Fusion draft picks
New England Revolution coaches
United States men's international soccer players
2009 CONCACAF Gold Cup players
People from Longmeadow, Massachusetts
Sportspeople from Nashua, New Hampshire
Basketball players from Massachusetts
Soccer players from Massachusetts
All-American men's college soccer players
American men's basketball players